Färila is a locality situated in Ljusdal Municipality, Gävleborg County, Sweden with 1,293 inhabitants in 2010. Färila is situated in a valley near the river Ljusnan. People to commute to and from Ljusdal. The town is an industrial centre in Ljusdal Municipality.

Sports
The following sports clubs are located in Färila:

 Färila IF

References 

Populated places in Ljusdal Municipality
Hälsingland